The Maritime University Field Lacrosse League (MUFLL) is an association of men’s field lacrosse teams connected with universities in New Brunswick, Nova Scotia and Prince Edward Island. Teams compete in the fall with league playoffs typically in early November. Established in 2005, MUFLL currently has six member schools competing.

Teams

Former teams 

 Acadia University (2008-2017)

Champions

References

External links
 Maritime University Field Lacrosse League

Lacrosse governing bodies of Canada
Lacrosse leagues in Canada
2005 establishments in Canada
Sports leagues established in 2005